The Prime League 2009 (officially known as the Great-Eastern-Yeo's Prime League for sponsorship reasons) is the 13th season since the establishment of the Prime League. The season began on 3 March 2009, and ended on 3 October 2009.

League table

Top scorers

See also
S. League

External links
Prime League

 

2009 domestic association football leagues
Prime League